Maria Teresa Gargano (born ) is an Italian female artistic gymnast, representing her nation at international competitions.  

She won the silver medal in the team event at the 2002  European Women's Artistic Gymnastics Championships, and participated at the 2003 World Artistic Gymnastics Championships. She participated at the 2004 Summer Olympics.

References

External links
http://gymnast.bplaced.com/AG/Gargano.htm
http://www.gymmedia.com/artistic-gymnastics/Comeback-Ioannis-Melissanidis-starts-again-after-break-18-Month
https://www.youtube.com/watch?v=DflRzaCELlo

1986 births
Living people
Italian female artistic gymnasts
Gymnasts from Rome
Gymnasts at the 2004 Summer Olympics
Olympic gymnasts of Italy
Mediterranean Games silver medalists for Italy
Mediterranean Games bronze medalists for Italy
Mediterranean Games medalists in gymnastics
Competitors at the 2001 Mediterranean Games
21st-century Italian women